Julius Grøntved (sometimes spelled Gröntved) (1899–1967) was a Danish botanist and phycologist.

Selected scientific works
 Grøntved, Julius & Seidenfaden, Gunnar (1938) The Phytoplankton of the waters West of Greenland (The Godthaab Expedition 1928: Leader: Eigil Riis-Carstensen). Meddelelser om Grønland 82 (5): 1-380.
 Grøntved, J. (1940) Das Wattenmeer bei Skallingen: Physiographisch-biologische Untersuchung eines dänischen Tidengebietes. 2. Quantitative und qualitative Untersuchung des Mikroplanktons während der Gezeiten. Folia Geographica Danica 2 (2): 1-67.
 Grøntved, J. (1948) On the taxonomy of the Dinoflagellates in general. Biologiske Skrifter / Kongelige Danske Videnskabernes Selskab 6 (1): 1−67.
 Bertelsen, E. & Grøntved, J. (1949) The light organs of a bathypelagic fish Argyropelecus olfersi (Cuvier) photographed by its own light. Videnskabelige Meddelelser fra Dansk naturhistorisk Forening 111 (3): 163-167.
 Grøntved, J. (1949) Dansk botanisk literatur i 1944, 1945, 1946 og 1947 [translated title: Danish botanical literature 1944-1947]. Botanisk Tidsskrift 48 (3).
 Grøntved, J. (1949) Investigations on the phytoplankton in the Danish Wadden Sea in July 1941. Meddelelser fra Kommissionen for Danmarks Fiskeri- og Havundersøgelser: Serie Plankton 5(2):1-55.
 Grøntved, J. (1950) Phytoplankton studies. 1. Nitzschia frigida Grun., an Arctic-inner-Baltic diatom found in Danish waters. Biologiske Meddelelser / Kongelige Danske Videnskabernes Selskab 18, 1-19.
 Grøntved, J. (1950) Phytoplankton studies. 2. A new biological type within the genus Chaetoceros, Chaetoceros sessilis sp.nov. Biologiske Meddelelser / Kongelige Danske Videnskabernes Selskab 18 (17): 1-19.
 Grøntved, J. (1950) The phytoplankton of Præstø Fjord. Folia Geographica Danica 3 (6): 143−186.
 Grøntved, J. (1951) Thichophrya danae sp.nov., a suctorial protozoan from Greenland waters. Meddelelser om Grønland 142 (8).
 Grøntved, J. (1952) Investigations on the phytoplankton in the southern North Sea in May 1947. Meddelelser fra Kommissionen for Danmarks Fiskeri- og Havundersøgelser: Serie Plankton 5 (1): 1-49.
 Braarud, Trygve; Gaarder, Karen Ringdal & Grøntved, J. (1953) The phytoplankton of the North Sea and adjacent waters in May, 1948. Rapports et procès-verbaux des réunions / Conseil Permanent International pour l'Exploration de la Mer 133: 1−87.
 Grøntved, J. (1954) Planktological contributions I. Meddelelser fra Danmarks Fiskeri- og Havundersøgelser, N.S. 1 (8): 1−7.
 Grøntved, J. (1956) Planktological contributions II. Taxonomical studies in some Danish coastal localities. Meddelelser fra Danmarks Fiskeri- og Havundersøgelser, N.S. 1 (12): 1−13.
 Grøntved, J. (1957) A sampler for underwater macrovegetation in shallow waters. Journal du Conseil / Conseil Permanent International pour l'Exploration de la Mer 22: 293-297.
 Grøntved, J. & Steemann Nielsen, E. 1957: Investigations on the phytoplankton in sheltered Danish marine localities. Meddelelser fra Kommissionen for Danmarks Fiskeri- og Havundersøgelser: Serie Plankton 5: 1−52.
 Grøntved, J. (1958) Underwater Macrovegetation in Shallow Coastal Waters. Journal du Conseil / Conseil Permanent International pour l'Exploration de la Mer 24: 32-42.
 Grøntved, J. (1960) Planktological contributions IV. Taxonomical and productional investigations in shallow coastal waters. Meddelelser fra Danmarks Fiskeri- og Havundersøgelser N.S. 3 (1): 1−17.
 Grøntved, J. (1960) On the productivity of microbenthos and phytoplankton in some Danish fjords. Meddelelser fra Danmarks Fiskeri- og Havundersøgelser, N.S. 3 (3): 55-92.
 Grøntved, J. (1962) Preliminary report on the productivity of microbenthos and phytoplankton in the Danish Wadden Sea. Meddelelser fra Danmarks Fiskeri- og Havundersøgelser, N.S. 3 (12): 347-378.

References 

University of Copenhagen alumni
Botanists active in the Arctic
20th-century Danish botanists
Danish marine biologists
Danish phycologists
1899 births
1967 deaths
20th-century Danish zoologists